Two ships of the Soviet Navy have been named after the city of Novorossiysk on the Black Sea:

  - a

See also
 

Soviet Navy ship names